Yew Tree is a Liverpool City Council Ward within the Liverpool West Derby Parliamentary constituency. It borders Knotty Ash and West Derby. It was formed for the 2004 Municipal elections comprising most of the pre-2004 Dovecot ward and small parts of the Croxteth, Broadgreen and Gillmoss wards. The population of this ward taken at the 2011 census was 16,746.

Councillors

The ward has returned six Councillors

Election results

Elections of the 2010s

Elections of the 2000s 

After the boundary change of 2004 the whole of Liverpool City Council faced election. Three Councillors were returned at this election.

• italics denotes the sitting Councillor
• bold denotes the winning candidate

References

External links
Ward Profile - Yew Tree

Wards of Liverpool